The Bristol and Wessex Aeroplane Club is a flying club based at Bristol Airport, providing plane hire, flying instruction and a ground school for general aviation. The club was formed in 1927 and officially opened by the Air Minister, Sir Samuel Hoare, on 8 October of that year.

Operations

The Bristol and Wessex Aeroplane Club operates from the Bristol Flying School building in the Silver Zone of Bristol Airport, where it has classrooms and a restaurant. Its fleet includes a Cessna 172S, a Cessna C150L, two Piper PA-28-140, a Piper PA-28-161  and a Piper PA-28R-200.

The club provides trial flights, self-fly hire and professional flying training. They instruct for the Private Pilot Licence, NPPL, LAPL, the IMC rating, night tating and multi-engine piston rating.

References

Flying clubs
Aviation schools in the United Kingdom
1927 establishments in the United Kingdom
Organizations established in 1927